Chankheli is a rural municipality located in Humla District of Karnali Province of Nepal.

The rural municipality is divided into total 7 wards and the headquarters of the rural municipality is situated at Srimastha.

Demographics
At the time of the 2011 Nepal census, 99.5% of the population in Chankheli Rural Municipality spoke Nepali and 0.2% Sign language as their first language; 0.3% spoke other languages.

In terms of ethnicity/caste, 32.2% were Chhetri, 18.0% Thakuri, 16.1% Hill Brahmin, 13.9% Byasi/Sauka, 8.7% Kami, 7.2% Tamang, 2.7% Damai/Dholi, 0.7% Sarki and 0.5% others.

In terms of religion, 80.4% were Hindu, 19.5% Buddhist and 0.1% others.

See also
Chankheli Peak

References

External links
 Official website

Populated places in Humla District
Rural municipalities in Karnali Province
Rural municipalities of Nepal established in 2017